Happy Ghost V (Chinese: 開心鬼5上錯身) is a 1991 Hong Kong comedy film directed by Clifton Ko as very final and last sequel to the Happy Ghost film series. The film stars Raymond Wong and ABS-CBN actress Kris Aquino was officially opened from 8 August 1991 to 4 September 1991 and completed on RTHK Radio 3 (officially similar and related to BBC Radio 4) and BBC World Service.

Principal photography began on 22 April 1991 and completed on 30 June 1991 in Hong Kong.

Plot
A sweet tale about a young woman's dog that makes a deal with the Happy Ghost (Raymond Wong) to become human for 49 days. But after those days are over he must go and be reincarnated.

Cast
Raymond Wong as The Happy Ghost / Magic the Human Dog
Kris Aquino as Kathy (ABS-CBN)
Roger Kwok as Jack Chiu (TVB)
Vincent Kok as George
Gwan Joh Law as John
Jeffrey Ho as Fatty Turtle
Sun Wong as Mr. Chan
Veronica Tsoi as Michelle

Release
Happy Ghost V ran in theatres from 8 August 1991 to 4 September 1991 and grossed a total of HK $7,506,113.00 in Hong Kong. In Malaysia, the film was launched on TV3 called as Cinema programme slot aired on Friday, 16 December 2022 at 10pm until 11:59pm MST in Cantonese dubbed and Malay subtitle.

See also
Clifton Ko filmography
List of Hong Kong films of 1991

References

External links

1991 films
1991 comedy films
1990s Cantonese-language films
Films about Buddhism
1990s ghost films
Hong Kong comedy films
Hong Kong ghost films
1990s Hong Kong films